The Marcgraviaceae are a neotropical angiosperm family in the order Ericales. The members of the family are shrubs, woody epiphytes, and lianas, with alternate, pinnately nerved leaves. The flowers are arranged in racemes. The flowers are accompanied by modified, fleshy, saccate bracts which produce nectar. The flowers are pentamerous. The fruits are capsules.

General
Marcgravia - (ca. 65 spp.): S Mexico, Mesoamerica, South America, Antilles
Marcgraviastrum - (15 spp.): S Nicaragua to Peru, Bolivia plus 2 spp. in E Brazil
Norantea - (2 spp.): Caribbean and Amazonian basin of NE South America
Ruyschia - (9 spp.): Mesoamerica, N Andes, Lesser Antilles
Sarcopera - (ca. 10 spp.): Honduras to N Bolivia, Guyayana Highlands
Schwartzia - (ca. 15 spp.): Costa Rica through the Andes south to Bolivia, in the Caribbean basin and 1 sp. in E Brazil
Souroubea - (19 spp.): Mexico to Bolivia (absent from the Antilles)

There are 2 known subfamilies; Marcgravioideae (containing Marcgravia and Marcgraviastrum) and Noranteoideae (containing the rest of the genera).

Former genus include Pseudosarcopera (now listed as a synonym of Sarcopera).

References

Other sources
 Bedell, H.G. 1989. Marcgraviaceae. In: Howard, R.A. (ed.). Flora of the Lesser Antilles 5: 300-310.
 Dressler, S. 2000. Marcgraviaceae. In: Flora de República de Cuba, Ser. A, Fasc. 5: 1-14.
 Dressler, S. 2001. Marcgraviaceae. In: Steyermark, J.A., P.E. Berry, K. Yatskievych & B.K. Holst (eds.), Flora of the Venezuelan Guayana vol 6, pp. 248-260.  Missouri Botanical Garden, St. Louis.
 Dressler, S. 2004. Marcgraviaceae. In: Kubitzki, K. (ed.). The Families and Genera of Vascular Plants. vol. 6, pp. 258-265. Springer-Verlag, Berlin.

External links
 Marcgraviaceae in L. Watson and M.J. Dallwitz (1992 onwards). The families of flowering plants: descriptions, illustrations, identification, information retrieval. http://delta-intkey.com

 
Ericales families